Wilfredo Maisonave Oriol (born 17 September 1951 in Mayagüez, Puerto Rico) is a Puerto Rican former long jumper who competed in the 1972 Summer Olympics.  He was one of the torch lighters of the 2010 Central American and Caribbean Games.

References

1951 births
Living people
Puerto Rican male long jumpers
People from Mayagüez, Puerto Rico
Puerto Rican male triple jumpers
Olympic track and field athletes of Puerto Rico
Athletes (track and field) at the 1972 Summer Olympics
Central American and Caribbean Games gold medalists for Puerto Rico
Competitors at the 1974 Central American and Caribbean Games
Central American and Caribbean Games medalists in athletics